Canon Island (Inis na Canánach in Irish) is an island situated in the River Shannon, about  east of the village of Kildysart, County Clare in Ireland and about  from the shore on the mainland.

The island is home to the ruins of Canon Island Abbey, an Augustinian monastery built in the late 12th century.

References 

 A Topographical Dictionary of Ireland by Samuel Lewis at Library Ireland

Islands of County Clare
Uninhabited islands of Ireland
River Shannon
River islands of Ireland